Eddie Jose Gazo Roa (born 12 September 1950) is a Nicaraguan former professional boxer who competed from 1969 to 1984. He held the Lineal and WBA light middleweight titles from 1977 to 1978.

Professional career
Gazo turned pro in 1971, and captured the WBA and lineal light middleweight titles in 1977 with a decision win over Miguel Angel Castellini. That year he was named The Ring magazine Progress of the Year fighter. He defended the belt three times before losing it to Masashi Kudo the following year. He retired in 1984 following a string of losses that concluded with a defeat to Julian Jackson.

Professional boxing record

See also
List of world light-middleweight boxing champions

References

External links

Eddie Gazo - CBZ Profile

1950 births
Living people
Nicaraguan male boxers
People from Boaco Department
World Boxing Association champions
The Ring (magazine) champions
Light-middleweight boxers
World light-middleweight boxing champions